Suuga is a village in Mulgi Parish in Viljandi County in southern Estonia. It borders the villages of Tuhalaane and Muri as well as other villages in the former Paistu Parish.

References

Villages in Viljandi County